Sim is a surname, and may refer to:

Alastair Sim (1900–1976), Scottish actor
George Hamilton Sim (1852–1929), British soldier who played football for the Royal Engineers A.F.C.
Chea Sim (born 1932), Chinese-Cambodian politician
Dave Sim (born 1956), Canadian comic book author
Gordon Sim, set decorator
Jon Sim (born 1977), Canadian ice hockey player
Sheila Sim (1922–2016), English actress
Thomas Robertson Sim (1858–1938), South African botanist
Sir William Alexander Sim (1858–1928), New Zealand judge
Surnames from given names